The Afro-Shirazi Party (ASP) was a Marxist-Leninist, African nationalist Zanzibari political party formed between the mostly Shirazi Shiraz Party and the mostly African Afro Party.

In the 1963 Zanzibari general election, the ASP claimed 13 seats and the majority of votes cast, yet the election ended up favouring the Zanzibar Nationalist Party and Zanzibar and Pemba People's Party alliance who collectively claimed 18 seats. Unsatisfied with such unfair representation in parliament, the ASP, headed by Abeid Karume, collaborated with the Umma Party to begin the Zanzibar Revolution on 12 January 1964. The revolution overthrew the Sultanate of Zanzibar and established the People's Republic of Zanzibar, ruled by Abeid Karume. Following the establishment of the republic, the ASP banned the previous ruling parties—the Zanzibar Nationalist Parity and the Zanzibar and Pemba People's Party. On 5 February 1977, the party joined with the Tanganyika African National Union (TANU) to form Chama Cha Mapinduzi (CCM).

See also
Tanganyika African Association

References

African and Black nationalist parties in Africa
African socialist political parties
Black political parties
Chama Cha Mapinduzi
Communist parties in Africa
Defunct political parties in Zanzibar
National liberation movements in Africa
Parties of one-party systems
Political parties disestablished in 1977
Political parties established in 1957
Socialist parties in Tanzania